The Army of the Socialist Republic of Romania, known as the Army of the Romanian People's Republic, until 1965 was the army of the Socialist Republic of Romania (Romanian People's Republic until 1965) from 1947 to 1989. Following the Romanian Revolution in 1989 it was renamed into the Romanian Armed Forces. It consisted of the Ground Forces, the Navy and the Air Force.

History

In 1944 the Red Army invaded Romania in the Jassy-Kishinev Offensive, causing the overthrow of Ion Antonescu's regime via a Royal coup. In 1945, new military regulations were developed based on those of the Red Army and in 1946, Romania came completely under the influence of the Soviet Union and became part of the Eastern Bloc. The military regulations were finalized in 1949. Like all other socialist states, the Army was subjected to the rule of the Romanian Communist Party, whose general secretary was, since 1974, President of the Republic in addition to his role as commander-in-chief of the army.

During the tenure of General Emil Bodnăraș as defence minister, the Army went through a period of Sovietization, with Bodnăraș personally sending several Romanian Communists to Moscow to be trained in Soviet military institutions such as the Frunze Military Academy. 30% of the experienced officers corps were purged from the military due to fears of opposition and monarchist loyalties. Between 1949 and 1952, over 700 Romanian military personnel were being trained in the USSR, a number that would drop by over 200 by in the next 6 years. They also adopted a Soviet-style full dress uniform and everyday uniform. In the early days of the Republic, the Soviet Armed Forces had troops stationed in the country. The Soviet presence came as a result of the Soviet occupation of Romania. Bodnăraș was seen to have influence in Nikita Khrushchev's decision to withdraw Soviet troops in 1958.

From May 1955 to 1991, Romania was a member of the Warsaw Pact, which provided the Romanian Army with weapons and other Soviet-made equipment, as well as assistance in building up its own defense industry. Under the presidency of Nicolae Ceaușescu, the RPA asserted functional independence in the defense industry and on equipment acquisitions while maintaining strong ties to the Warsaw Pact Command, with many of its armored vehicles, aircraft and artillery, as well as individual weaponry, being nationally produced. Also, a new set of enlisted and NCO ranks were adopted in the 1970s, alongside the reinstatement of the senior NCO ranks (maistru militar), which replaced the former Soviet rank model for such personnel. On 12 March 1958, the Sports Committee of Friendly Armies was created, with the Romanian Army became a founding member. In November 1986, a referendum was held by the government in which voters, when asked whether they approved of reducing the size of the army and cutting military spending by 5%, approved the proposals by 100%, with not a single vote counting against it. 

The Armed Forces would be renamed in 1989 following the Romanian Revolution, during which officers and personnel of the military defected to the side of the opposition after a public speech by Ceaușescu broadcast on state television and a firing squad provided by paratroop regiment personnel Captain Ionel Boeru, Sergeant-Major Georghin Octavian and Dorin-Marian Cîrlan took part in the Trial and execution of Nicolae and Elena Ceaușescu on 26 December. In the week after Ceaușescu's downfall, the defected Armed Forces fought bloody street battles against Securitate forces who were still on Ceaușescu's side.

Political and military leadership

Supreme Commander-in-Chief
The title of Supreme Commander-in-Chief was held by the de facto leader of the nation, General Secretary, despite the fact that the President of the State Council was the de jure head of state until 1974, when it was replaced by the President of Romania.

Minister of National Defence
The office of Minister of National Defence is the chief political leader of the military. Before that, it was the Minister of War who handled military affairs in the government. The country's defense policy was managed by the agency the minister headed, the Ministry of the National Defense, led by a professional officer with the rank of Colonel general or above. The minister was a permanent member of the Politburo of the PCR.

Chief of the General Staff

Components

As of 1985, the Army was organized into the following service branches:

 Ground Forces (Forțele Terestre) 
 Air Forces (Forțele Aeriene)
 Navy (Marina)

Several other branches were not part of the Ministry of National Defense but were directly controlled by the Romanian Army or the PCR:

 Patriotic Guards (Gărzile Patriotice)
 Security Troops (Trupele de securitate)
 Border Troops (Trupele de frontieră)

A distinctive feature of the system of manning the RAF armed forces was the continued possibility of conscription of women for military service (although the bulk of the female military personnel serving at that time were doctors, nurses, and radio communications operators).

The Army active personnel amounted to the following numbers:
 

From 1947 to 1960, the military was organized into 3 military regions: Western (based in Cluj), Eastern (based in Bacău), and South (based in Bucharest). Succeeded by army corps in the 60s, they were areas that in wartime would become an army corps with their headquarters acting as areas of responsibility.

Ground Forces

The senior most units in the ground forces was the Tudor Vladimirescu Division and the Horia, Cloșca și Crișan Division, both of which were used as political tools by communist leaders. They were composed of former prisoners of war, Soviet trainees and Communist activists such as Valter Roman.

In 1980, the Romanian Ground Forces was reorganized in 4 Army Commands:

1st Army Command (Bucharest)
2nd Army Command (Buzău)
3rd Army Command (Craiova)
4th Army Command (Cluj-Napoca)

All four Army Commands consisted of 8 Mechanized Infantry Divisions, 2 Armoured Divisions and 1 Armoured Brigade, as well as 4 Mountain infantry Brigades as specialized motorized infantry units, in addition to an administrative division of 4 parachute infantry regiments. Between 1960 and 1964, the rifle/mechanized divisions were converted to mechanized infantry (motorized rifle) divisions, which resulted in reductions in size due to it being a merger of both types of units. The newly established mechanized infantry divisions were structured similarly to the Soviet ones, organized into a division HQ, three mechanized infantry regiments, a tank regiment, a field artillery regiment, as well as in battalion-size subunits of other specialities, while the armoured  divisions were structured in three tank regiments, a mechanized infantry regiment, a field artillery regiment and a number of other battalion-size subunits of other specialities.

The degree of mechanization of the infantry was not complete, unlike the other member states of the Warsaw Treaty, for in 1985 only two of the three infantry battalions from the composition of the mechanized regiments were equipped with wheeled armoured personnel carriers TAB-71 and TAB-77. Even though since 1985 the infantry regiments began receiving new amphibious tracked infantry fighting vehicle MLI-84 the mechanization of the whole infantry had not succeed until 1989.

Disbanded by the Soviets in the early years of occupied and post-war Romania, the Vânători de munte (Mountain Huntsmen) was reestablished in 1958, being the equivalent of the Soviet 7th Guards Mountain Air Assault Division or the American 10th Mountain Division. It was considered the Ground Forces' best-trained unit due to its equipment consisting of MLVM APCs and 76mm. mountain guns, and was organized into 4 brigades stationed in the mountainous areas. The Special Counter-terrorism Unit (Unitatea Specială de Luptă Antiteroristă, USLA) was a key part of the Ground Forces security aspect, preventing terrorist attacks such as a May 1985 attempt by two Arab terrorists to bomb cars belonging to Syrian students on the Politehnica University of Bucharest Grozăvești Campus parking lot.

Navy

In the early postwar years, the Romanian Navy was deprived of its merchant fleet due to the rapid takeover of the Romanian vessels by the Soviet Navy. In September 1944, the Soviet Navy transferred all Romanian warships to ports in the Caucasus near Azerbaijan and Georgia, all of which were not returned until just over a year later, with the exception o the Regele Ferdinand-class that was kept by the Black Sea Fleet until the early 1950s. A number of warships such as Amiral Murgescu were never returned and stayed in Soviet service until they were decommissioned. Once in possession of patrol ships, the Romanian Navy formed Danube Squadron, which later changed its name to the River Brigade in 1959. As a result of the 1940s reform of the naval forces, a patrol squadron was converted into an independent unit, which operated under the Naval Headquarters until May 1951. Four years later, naval ships and Marine units were subordinated to the headquarters.

In 1962, the 42nd Maritime Division was founded, continuing the traditions of the Sea Division, a large unit was had ceased to carry out functions since the end of World War II. In the late 70s and early 80s, several naval ships were built in the Romanian shipyards, specifically the Midia and Constanța escort ships from the Brăila shipyard. In the early 1980s, the Navy ramped up efforts to develop its own domestic naval industry by building new patrol boats using Chinese and Soviet technology and designs. In 1989 the Romanian Navy had more than 7,500 sailors, all of whom were organized into the Black Sea Fleet, the Danube Squadron, and the Coastal Defense. Its major naval bases and shipyards were the ports of Mangalia and Constanța on the Black Sea. Based in Constanța, the 2,000-member Coastal Defense Regiment was the shore-based component of defense against attack from the Black Sea.

Air Force

In 1946, following a reorganization, the Air Force consisted of seven Air Flotillas, of which two were fighter flotillas and the rest were bombardment, assault, information, and transport. A total of 953 aircraft were in service, these included both pre-war and WW2 models like the Bf 109G, IAR 80, IAR 37, Ju 88, etc.

Following a condition imposed during the Paris Peace Treaties of 1947, the strength of the military aviation of Romania was reduced to 150 aircraft, of which 100 were for combat and the rest for training. On 15 February 1949, the Romanian Aviation Command was established following the Soviet model of aviation regiments instead of the British squadron model. This would later be renamed to the Romanian Air Force. 

The first jet fighters arrived in 1951, with the first Jet Air Division (Divizia Aeriană Reactivă) being established on 1 April of the same year, at Ianca. The unit was equipped with Soviet-made Yak-23 and Yak-17 fighters and had three Regiments (the 11th, 12th and 13th). The 97th Jet Fighter Aviation Division was declared combat ready on 15 September 1951. The first interception mission was carried out on the night of 28/29 October 1952, when a Soviet Il-28 bomber entered Romanian airspace unauthorized. The first MiG-15s also entered service in 1952. These aircraft were first in use with the Soviet Regiments deployed at Craiova and Deveselu and were transferred to the Romanian Air Force in September 1952. The first supersonic flight happened on 5 March 1958, with a MiG-19 at the Deveselu Air Base.

In 1969, an air defence unit was created to provide protection against air attacks while a paratrooper regiment was founded in 1980, both of which were assigned to the Câmpia Turzii Air Base (now the RoAF 71st Air Base). A Romanian-made IAR-93 attack aircraft flew its first flight on 31 October 1974 over Bacău, marking the first jet fighter in the Eastern Bloc to be domestically manufactured. The Mikoyan MiG-29 aircraft entered the inventory of the Air Force just a few days before the Romanian Revolution of December 1989.

Patriotic Guards

Formed in 1968 after Ceaușescu's speech of 21 August 1968, the Romanian Patriotic Guards was an organization dedicated to public security, with its functions including civil policing to an active reserve for the Army. During wartime, the President of the Republic could authorize the guards to become a large "Militia" that would provide military police-style security, as well as augment the ground forces, and operate as guerrillas forces. The force was not part of the Ministry of National Defence but was instead a directly reporting unit of the PCR and the Union of Communist Youth, of which it drafted members of both. Members of the guards were considered territorial troops (Forțele teritoriale), as they were organized into companies and/or platoons and were based in every județ, municipality, and industrial/agricultural area under the command of the first secretary of the local PCR.

Securitate Troops
On 23 January 1949, the communist government disbanded the Royal Romanian Gendarmerie only to purged its personnel and redistribute them to the newly created Directorate for Security Troops (DTO) of the Securitate (Department of State Security), modeled after the NKVD's Internal Troops and the KGB. It acted as a 20,000-strong eilite paramilitary force consisting of selected people form the conscripts pool for the Army who performed routine law enforcement functions such traffic control and issuance of identification cards. It was organized into infantry units who were equipped with small arms as well as artillery, and armored personnel carriers. The security troops were directly responsible to the Minister of the Interior and there the Supreme Commander-in-Chief, giving then the ability to guard important installations including PCR office buildings and state radio and television stations.

The regime of Ceaușescu could have theoretically called in the security troops as a private army to prevent a military coup d'état and/or suppress antiregime riots. It was also responsible for ensuring total loyalty among the rank and file in the Army, employing political officers to push the country's military doctrine. It operated under a more strict discipline and routine than the regular military, which resulted in their special treatment and enjoyment of better living conditions then their counterparts. In late 1989, the directorate was disbanded and replaced first by the Guard and Order Troops (Trupele de Pază și Ordine), and later on the reformed Gendarmerie.

Equipment

Armored fighting vehicles
Main battle tanks (MBTs):
 1,053 x T-34
 756 x T-55
 413 x TR-580
 617 x TR-85
 30 x T-72

Assault guns:
 326 x SU-76
 66 x SU-100
 20 x ISU-152

Infantry fighting vehicles (IFVs):
 154 x MLI-84

Armored personnel carriers (APCs):
 26 x BTR-40
 35 x BTR-50
 50 x BTR-60
 155 x TAB-77
 441 x TABC-79
 1,870 x TAB-71
 53 x MLVM

Reconnaissance:
 139 x BRDM-2
 8 x TAB-80

Artillery
Total: 3,707

Heavy artillery:
 240 mm mortar M240

Navy
Ships:
 Poti-class corvette
  Kronshtadt-class submarine chaser
 Osa-class missile boat
 Type 025 torpedo boat
 Epitrop class fast attack craft
 Type 062 gunboat
 Cosar class minelayers 
 Democrația-class minesweeper

In the early 1990s, the equipment for major units were scrapped due to age and the cost of maintenance.

See also
Korean People's Army
Nationale Volksarmee
Polish People's Army
Hungarian People's Army
Bulgarian People's Army
Albanian People's Army
List of wars involving Romania

Videos
110. Armata României în Decembrie 1989 
Cenusa pasarii din vis (1989) (1)
Revoluţia română: La TVR se anunță că Armata Română va apăra obiective importante din Bucureşti
Armata Republicii Socialiste România
Socialist Romania Military Oath – Jurământul Militar din Armata RSR

References

Socialist Republic of Romania
Military history of Romania
1947 establishments in Romania
1989 disestablishments in Romania
Military units and formations established in 1947
Military units and formations disestablished in 1989
1950s in Romania
1960s in Romania
1970s in Romania
1980s in Romania
Warsaw Pact
Military units and formations of the Cold War